Nephelium juglandifolium is a species of shrub. The drupe fruit is not as round as the other fruits within this genus. The shrub produces small flowers. The plants are grown in parks as decorative ornamental plants. In its natural environment, N. juglandifolium grows in lowland forests. It is usually 30m tall when fully grown.

External links
 Nephelium juglandifolium picture
 Nephelium info - Contains picture and info of Nephelium juglandifolium

juglandifolium